Banff Sheriff Court is a judicial structure in Low Street, Banff, Aberdeenshire, Scotland. The structure, which was the headquarters of Banffshire County Council and was also used as a courthouse, is a Category B listed building.

History
Originally, court hearings in Banffshire were held in a tolbooth which was built on the west side of Low Street, on the corner with Strait Path, in the early 16th century. From the late 18th century, court hearings were held in the newly-built Town House. In the mid-19th century it became necessary to commission a dedicated courthouse: the site the sheriff selected was occupied by a private house known as "Little Fillicap", which had been the home of Katharine Innes, Lady Gight, who was periodically visited there by her grandson, George Gordon Byron, who later became Lord Byron.

The courthouse was designed by James Matthews in the Italianate style, built by John Drysdale and Sons in ashlar stone at a cost of £7,214 and was officially opened by sheriff-substitute, James Gordon, on 28 January 1871. The design involved a symmetrical main frontage with seven bays facing onto Low Street. The central section of three bays, which was slightly projected forward, featured a three-bay single-storey portico formed by four pairs of Corinthian order columns supporting an entablature surmounted by a balustrade. On the first floor, the central section featured three round headed windows with keystones and architraves, while the outer bays were fenestrated with segmental headed windows on the ground floor and by round headed windows on the first floor, all with keystones and architraves. Internally, the principal room was a double-height courtroom.

Following the implementation of the Local Government (Scotland) Act 1889, which established county councils in every county, the new county leaders needed to identify offices for Banffshire County Council. A council chamber was established, for this purpose, on the first floor of the building. After the abolition of Banffshire County Council in 1975, the building reverted to being used solely for judicial purposes. The courtroom continued to be used for hearings of the sheriff's court and, on one day a month, for hearings of the justice of the peace court.

See also
 List of listed buildings in Banff, Aberdeenshire

References

Government buildings completed in 1871
County halls in Scotland
Category B listed buildings in Aberdeenshire
Court buildings in Scotland